The Dayton Flyers baseball team is a varsity intercollegiate athletic team of the University of Dayton in Dayton, Ohio, United States. The team is a member of the Atlantic 10 Conference, which is part of the National Collegiate Athletic Association's Division I. The team plays its home games at Woerner Field in Dayton, Ohio. The Flyers are coached by Jayson King.

Year-by-year results

Below is a table of Dayton's yearly records as an NCAA Division I baseball program.

Major League Baseball
Dayton has had 15 Major League Baseball Draft selections since the draft began in 1965. Two of them, Jerry Blevins and Craig Stammen, have reached the Major Leagues.

See also
List of NCAA Division I baseball programs

References

External links